Joris Pijs (born 2 April 1987) is a Dutch rower. He competed in the men's lightweight coxless four event at the 2016 Summer Olympics.

References

External links
 
 

1987 births
Living people
Dutch male rowers
Olympic rowers of the Netherlands
Rowers at the 2016 Summer Olympics
Place of birth missing (living people)